The North Carolina Forest Service, formerly known as the North Carolina Division of Forest Resources is a North Carolina state government agency responsible for providing land management assistance to landowners. The agency's primary responsibility is wildland fire control on all state and privately owned land in North Carolina, United States. The Service was a Division of the N.C. Department of Environment and Natural Resources until July 2011 and is now part of the North Carolina Department of Agriculture and Consumer Services.

History

1800s-1910s
 1891 - The North Carolina Geographic Survey is authorized by the state legislature. Joseph Austin Holmes, professor of Botany and Geology at N.C. State College is appointed State Geologist. This marked the first geological survey in the nation authorized by public funds. W.W. Ashe, a student at the University of North Carolina is appointed part-time Assistant in Forestry for the state Geologic Survey. Conducting timber investigations, he becomes the first state employee to carry out forestry work.
 1905 - The NC Geological Survey is reorganized and renamed the North Carolina Geological and Economic Survey. Joseph Hyde Pratt succeeds Joseph Holmes as State Geologist.
 1908 - The NC Geological and Economic Survey is split into three divisions. W.W. Ashe is employed as "Forestry Expert" in the new Forestry Division.
 1909 - John Simcox Holmes is appointed as the first state employed graduate forester.
 1915 - An act of the NC General Assembly provides the first forest fire wardens and gives them law enforcement powers. The act also authorizes the state to acquire and administer state forests and parks. John Simcox Holmes is given the titles of State Forester and State Forest Warden. However, no state funds are appropriated for the positions. Mount Mitchell State Park is formed and entrusted to the state Geological and Economic Survey.
 1918 - The first state Extension Forester, Harvey B. Krausz, is appointed. The position is under the joint jurisdiction of the US Forest Service, States Relation Service, and the NC Geological and Economic Survey. All farm woodland is placed under the Extension Forester's authority, except for fire control activities.

1920s-1940s

 1921 - Walter Darell Clark appointed to assist State Forester John Simcox Holmes and given title of Chief Forest Warden. The NC legislature appropriates the first funds for fire protection. Less than $3000. The first county wildfire control cooperators, Avery, Buncombe, Jackson and New Hanover, appropriate a total of $1500 for use on a 50-50 matching basis with the state.
 1922 - Over 20 counties cooperate with the state through matching funds for wildfire suppression. Each has a County Fire Warden. The first districts are formed in Asheville and Lenoir (1 and 2). A third is soon added in Fayetteville. District Warden's titles are changed to District Forester.
 1925 - The NC Geological and Economic Survey is reorganized and the NC Department of Conservation and Development is formed by the NC legislature. The Division of Forestry is placed under the new department.
 1926 - The state constructs its first fire tower, in Harnett County.
 1927 - The Game Division is formed as part of the Department of Conservation and Development. Game law enforcement is assigned to the Division of Forestry.
 1933-1938 - The Civilian Conservation Corps makes important contributions to the state's forestry efforts. 52 fire towers were constructed. Hundreds of miles of woods trails were made. Almost 15 million trees were planted. Over 6,000 acres of timber stand improvement work was carried out.
 1937 - The first survey of NC Forest Resources is made.
 1939 - Bladen Lake State Forest, a former land utilization project site, is acquired from the US Resettlement Administration under a long-term lease. The state Division of Forestry is given responsibility for investigating and controlling forest insects and diseases.
 1945 - Combination Fire and Game Wardens are given the choice of working for either the Forestry Division or the Game Division. Forestry stops enforcement of game laws. William K. Beichler becomes NC's second State Forester following the resignation of John Simcox Holmes.
 1948 - The state Division of Forestry receives its first forest management funds and takes charge of the Farm Forestry Program from the Extension Service.
 1949 - The State Parks Division is created, removing authority over the parks from the Division of Forestry.

1950s-1960s

 1950 - William Beichler steps down as State Forester. The Cooperative Forest Management act is passed. It makes federal funds available to hire more state service foresters.
 1951 - Fred H. Claridge becomes State Forester.
 1953 - The state Division of Forestry purchases its first scout plane: a Piper Cub. The Little River Nursery at Goldsboro is authorized.
 1954 - The US Resettlement Administration deeds the Bladen State Forest property to the state on condition that it be used for public purposes.
 1955 - The N.C. Legislature authorizes the state to execute a compact with other southern states for mutual aid in fighting forest fires. Over 600,000 acres burn from a single fire covering areas of Hyde, Washington, and Tyrrell counties. Subsequently, the first statewide master forest fire plan is developed.
 1963 - April 4, "Black Thursday": 127 fires burn 185,000 acres. First Tree Improvement Program seed orchard established at Ralph Edwards Nursery.
 1966 - Fred H. Claridge steps down as State Forester. Ralph C. Winkworth is promoted to replace him.
 1969 - N.C. becomes the first state in nation to get legislative authority & funding to provide custom forestation work for landowners

1970s-1990s

 1970 - NCFS becomes the first state agency to send a crew to a western state to fight fire.
 1973 - The forerunner of the state Educational State Forest System, the Small State Forest System, is developed. The Griffiths State Forest Nursery is re-established as Clayton State Forest, the first of the Small State Forest System. At a dedication, State Forester Ralph Winkworth describes the forest's mission as "a supplement to the state park system with the primary mission of explaining the forest and forestry."
 1975 - Clayton State Forest is renamed Clemmons State Forest in honor of former forest supervisor Moody Clemmons.
 1977 - Implementation of Forest Development cost-share program begins.
 1980 - State Forester Ralph Winkworth passes away.
 1981 - H.J. "Boe" Green takes over as State Forester.
 1985 - H.J. Green steps down as State Forester. Harry Layman replaces him. The Allen Road Fire burns 93,000 acres.
 1986 - The Small State Forest System is changed to the Educational State Forest System. The Topsail Fires burn 73,000 acres.
 1989 - Implementation of Forest Practices Guidelines related to water quality begins.
 1991 - Stanford Adams becomes State Forester.
 1992 - For the first time, a division Incident Management Team is sent out of state. The team is deployed to Florida to assist with the recovery from Hurricane Andrew.
 1994 - The Fish Day Fire burns 24,600 acres on U.S. Forest Service land.
 1997 - The division is the first state agency to acquire a CL-215 "Super Scooper" air tanker.

2000-present

 2003 - The division adopts the national Firewise Communities USA Program
 2004 - The one millionth acre planted under the Forest Development Program is celebrated.
 2006 - State Forester Stanford Adams retires.
 2007 - Wib Owen is named State Forester.
 2008 - The 40,704 acre Evans Road Fire burns in Hyde, Tyrrell and Washington counties.
 2010 - The North Carolina State Forest Assessment is completed.
 2011 - After being known as the "North Carolina Division of Forest Resources" for several decades, the agency's name is changed back to the "North Carolina Forest Service" and it is transferred from the authority of the Department of Environment and Natural Resources to the Department of Agriculture and Consumer Services.
 2012 - Scott Bissette is appointed Assistant Commissioner and Greg Pate State Forester.
 2014 - Greg Pate retires and assumes the Alabama State Forester position. David Lane is appointed State Forester on April 14.

See also

Government of North Carolina

References

External links
North Carolina Forest Service
North Carolina Department of Agriculture and Consumer Services

Forest Service